Lindsay Mervyn Crocker, born 16 May 1958 in Taumarunui, is a former New Zealand cricketer who played 54 first-class matches for Northern Districts in the 1980s. He scored 2663 runs at 27.45 in his career for the Northern Districts as an opening batsman. After his retirement, he got involved in administration and was Auckland's chief executive for 7 years.

References

1958 births
Living people
New Zealand cricketers
Northern Districts cricketers